Global Operations is a first-person tactical shooter video game developed by Barking Dog Studios and co-published by Crave Entertainment and Electronic Arts. It was released in March 2002, following its public multiplayer beta version which contained only the Quebec map. The full game featured thirteen maps and featured both a single player and a multiplayer mode, which supported up to twenty-four players and three teams. Afterwards, a multiplayer demo with only the Antarctica map was released. The game was built on the Lithtech game engine.

Gameplay
The game focused on firearms in a special forces setting, with a mixture of military and counter-terrorist type themes. The game featured a large number of firearms, numbering in the dozens and including a wide selection of handguns and rifles. Many of them could be further customized as well. For example, a C-mag and silencer could be added.

The singleplayer and the multiplayer offered different specialities (Commando, Recon, Medic, Heavy Gunner, Demolitions Expert and Sniper) with extra abilities and class-specific weapons. All classes could use all other classes' firearms (by picking them up off the battlefield), but each class might not have the same level of skill with a given weapon (such as less precision).

Other features existed as well, including a life-sign tracking device, as well other game items like tear gas grenades, smoke grenades and medkit. A LAW (Lightweight Anti-tank Weapon) could be used, as well as night vision and thermal vision.

The existing player base has continued improving the game by way of modifications and custom maps.

Reception
The game received favourable initial reception. Actiontrip currently has the game at an 8.1 "very good" rating citing advanced teamwork over Counter-Strike. The game holds a 79 on Metacritic based on 13 critics.

References

External links
 Official Global Operations Website - Mirror of the official Global Operations website

2002 video games
Crave Entertainment games
Electronic Arts games
First-person shooters
Tactical shooter video games
LithTech games
Video games developed in Canada
Windows games
Windows-only games
Video games set in Africa
Video games set in Antarctica
Video games set in Argentina
Video games set in Canada
Video games set in Colombia
Video games set in Mexico
Video games set in Peru
Video games set in Russia
Video games set in Sri Lanka
Video games set in the United States
Video games set in Uganda
Multiplayer and single-player video games